Alexander von der Groeben (born 5 October 1955) is a German former judoka. He competed at the 1984 Summer Olympics and the 1988 Summer Olympics.

References

External links
 

1955 births
Living people
German male judoka
Olympic judoka of West Germany
Judoka at the 1984 Summer Olympics
Judoka at the 1988 Summer Olympics
People from Ratingen
Sportspeople from Düsseldorf (region)